Events in the year 2022 in Syria

Incumbents
 President: Bashar al-Assad
 Prime Minister: Hussein Arnous

Events
For events related to the civil war, see Timeline of the Syrian civil war (2022)

 22 February – Syria voices support for Russia's recognition of the Donetsk People's Republic and the Luhansk People's Republic as independent states.
 1 March – Eleven people die after a fire breaks out in a mall in Damascus.
 20 July – The Foreign Ministry of Syria announces that the country is formally suspending diplomatic relations with Ukraine.
 4 September – A Syrian Air Force helicopter crashes in Hama, Syria, killing all of the people on board.
 7 September – Eleven people are killed and two others are injured by a building collapse in Aleppo.
 10 September – The Kurdish administration in Syria, the Autonomous Administration of North and East Syria, requests help from the World Health Organization to contain a cholera outbreak which has killed three people in the region.
 22 September – At least 71 people are killed when a boat carrying migrants from Lebanon capsizes off Syria's coast.
 26 September – The death toll from the cholera outbreak in Syria increases to 29, with a total of 338 cases reported, the majority of whom are in Aleppo Governorate.
 5 December – Protests occur in the town of Atarib, Aleppo Governorate, after a Turkish military vehicle ran over and killed a woman and a child while conducting a patrol with a local rebel group, according to the Syrian Observatory for Human Rights.

Deaths

 30 January – Jawdat Said, 90, Islamic scholar.
 19 February – Walid Ikhlasi, 86, writer.
 23 February – Edmund Keeley, 94, Syrian-born American novelist and poet.
 11 March – Mohammed Saeed Bekheitan, 77, politician.
 15 May – Dhu al-Himma Shalish, 71, military officer.
 4 July – Khairy Alzahaby, 76, novelist and historian.
 5 August – Ali Haydar, 90, military officer.
 28 October – Safwan al-Qudsi, 82, politician, MP (since 1977).
 10 November – Humaydi Daham al-Hadi, 86, politician, co-governor of the Jazira canton (since 2014).
 26 December – Munira al-Qubaysi, 89, Islamic scholar, founder of Al-Qubaysiat.

References

 

 
Syria
Syria
2020s in Syria
Years of the 21st century in Syria